Moselle is a river in France, Luxembourg and Germany.

Moselle may also refer to:

Moselle (department), French département surrounding the river
Moselle (riverboat), American 19th-century riverboat
Moselle wine from the region around the river
River Moselle (London), England
Moselle, Mississippi, unincorporated community in the United States
Moselle, Missouri, unincorporated community in the United States
Mosel, Wisconsin, township in the United States, sometimes spelled Moselle and named after the river
Mosel, Wisconsin, unincorporated community in the above township
Open de Moselle, ATP tennis tournament

People with the surname
Tyler Moselle, American academic

See also
Mosel (disambiguation)
Mozelle (disambiguation)